The inauguration of William Howard Taft as the 27th president of the United States was held on Thursday, March 4, 1909, at the Senate chamber inside the United States Capitol, Washington, D.C. instead of the regular East Portico due to blizzard. This was the 31st inauguration and marked the commencement of William Howard Taft's only term as president and James S. Sherman's only term as vice president. 

Inaugural ceremonies and festivities
Due to a blizzard the night before that covered Washington, D.C. with 10 inches of snow, the inauguration was moved indoors, into the Senate chamber. The presidential oath of office was administered by Chief Justice Melville Fuller, who was doing so for his sixth and final time. The Chief Justice flubbed his lines. The new President took his oath on a century-old Bible belonging to the Supreme Court, which he used again in 1921 to take his oath as the Chief Justice of the United States. Despite the adverse weather conditions, the inaugural parade was not cancelled. 6,000 city workers used 500 wagons to remove 58,000 tons of snow to clean the parade route. For the first time in inauguration history, the incoming First Lady (in this case Helen Herron Taft) joined her husband in leading the parade from the Capitol to the White House. Probably during the parade, the choral march "Our Country" by Arthur Whiting was played.

An inaugural ball that evening was held at the Pension Building. It was the last official inaugural ball until 1949, as Taft's successor as president, Woodrow Wilson, asked the city of Washington not to hold it, thereby putting a temporary end to the practice. The tradition of inaugural balls was revived in 1949 as part of the second inauguration of Harry S. Truman.

See also
Presidency of William Howard Taft
1908 United States presidential election

References

External links

1909 in Washington, D.C.
1909 in American politics
United States presidential inaugurations
Inauguration
March 1909 events